Alex Molčan (born 1 December 1997) is a Slovak professional tennis player. Molčan has a career-high ATP singles ranking of World No. 38 achieved on 23 May 2022. He also has a career high ATP doubles ranking of No. 268 achieved on 14 June 2021.  He is currently the No. 1 Slovak tennis player in singles.
Molčan has reached three ATP 250 finals at the 2021 Belgrade Open, in  Morocco in 2022 and at the 2022 ATP Lyon Open. He also reached eleven singles ITF finals, with a record of 6 wins and 5 losses which includes a 2–2 result in ATP Challenger finals. Additionally, he has reached five career doubles ITF finals, with a record of 2 wins and 3 losses, including a 1–3 result in ATP Challenger finals.

Professional career

2021: First ATP final, Major debut & third round, Slovak  No. 1, top 100
Ranked No. 313 at the beginning of the year in January, Molčan made his ATP debut at the 2021 Antalya Open in Turkey, where he defeated Andrey Golubev and Blaž Kavčič to qualify for the main draw. Molčan then lost in the first round to France's Hugo Grenier in straight sets. 
In February he won the doubles title at the 2021 Challenger La Manche with compatriot Lukáš Klein.

In March, he advanced through the qualifying rounds of Open 13 in Marseille, France, defeating Antoine Hoang and Ernests Gulbis to reach his second main draw appearance. He was defeated in the first round by Lucas Pouille.

In May, at the 2021 Belgrade Open, after qualifying yet again, Molčan reached the final of an ATP tournament for the first time in his career by defeating two Serbian wildcard players Hamad Međedović and Peđa Krstin, Spaniard Fernando Verdasco and clay specialist Argentinian Federico Delbonis which propelled him 74 spots up into the top 200 at World No. 181 in the rankings on 31 May 2021. In the final, he lost in straight sets to the top seed and world No. 1 Novak Djokovic.

He entered the top 150 on 19 July 2021 after reaching the final of the 2021 Moneta Czech Open Challenger in Prostějov, and the round of 16 as a qualifier at the 2021 Hamburg European Open defeating Gianluca Mager. In August, he won his first Challenger title at the 2021 Svijany Open in Liberec defeating Tomáš Macháč in 58 minutes where he lost just 18 games to win the title.  As a result he hit a new career-high of No. 136 on 9 August 2021.

He made his Grand Slam debut the 2021 US Open after qualifying to the main draw. He overcame fellow qualifier and also making his debut Cem İlkel and Brandon Nakashima in five sets to reach the second and third round respectively for the first time in his career. In the third round, he was defeated by the eleventh seed Diego Schwartzman in straight sets. As a result he hit a new career-high of No. 117 on 13 September 2021. He became the No. 1 Slovak player on 8 November 2021 when he reached a career-high of No. 106 in the singles rankings following a semifinal at the Challenger in Bergamo. In November, he won the title at the 2021 Tali Open Challenger in Helsinki thus breaking into the top 100 at world No. 87 in the ATP year-end rankings on 22 November 2021.

2022: Top 40, two ATP 250 finals & 500 semifinal, Wimbledon third round
He reached a career-high ranking in the top 75 at World No. 74 on 10 January 2022.

On his debut at the 2022 Australian Open he recorded his first win at this Major defeating lucky loser Roman Safiullin in the first round.

In Marrakesh, Molčan recorded his first Top 10 win after defeating the top seed Félix Auger-Aliassime. He then advanced to his second career ATP final by defeating Botic van de Zandschulp and Laslo Djere. In the final, Molčan lost to David Goffin in 3 sets. As a result, Molčan's ranking rose 15 places, marking his top 50 debut on 11 April 2022.

Molčan hired fellow Slovak Marián Vajda to join his coaching team in May 2022.

At the 2022 ATP Lyon Open he reached the third tour-level final of his career, and second of the season by defeating former World No. 5 wildcard Jo-Wilfried Tsonga, 5th seed Karen Khachanov, Federico Coria and 4th seed Alex de Minaur en route without losing a set. He lost to top seed Cameron Norrie in three sets in the final. As a result he moved into the top 40 at World No. 38 on 23 May 2022.

He made his debut at the 2022 Wimbledon Championships and won his first match at this Major defeating Pedro Martínez. He reached the third round at this Major for the first time defeating Marcos Giron in the second round before losing to Taylor Fritz.

In Hamburg, Molčan reached the quarterfinals as an unseeded player, beating Marko Topo and 4th seed and defending champion Pablo Carreño Busta. He advanced to the biggest semifinal of his career after Borna Ćorić retired during their match with Molčan leading in the second set. He lost to Carlos Alcaraz in straight sets.

At the US Open  he lost in the first round to Thiago Monteiro (tennis).

2023: Masters third round 
Molčan started his 2023 season at the Maharashtra Open in Pune. Seeded fifth, he lost in the first round to Laslo Đere. At the ASB Classic in Auckland, he was defeated in the first round by Quentin Halys. At the Australian Open, he earned his first win of the year by beating 2014 champion, Stan Wawrinka, in the first round in a five-set thriller. He lost in the second round to sixth seed and world No. 7, Félix Auger-Aliassime.

After the Australian Open, Molčan represented Slovakia in the Davis Cup tie against the Netherlands. He lost to Tim van Rijthoven. In the end, the Netherlands won the tie over Slovakia 4-0. Seeded seventh at the Argentina Open, he fell in the first round to two-time champion Dominic Thiem. Seeded ninth at the Rio Open, he lost in the second round to Hugo Dellien. In Acapulco, he retired during his first-round match against Matteo Berrettini due to injury. In March, he competed at the BNP Paribas Open. Making his debut at this tournament, he upset 18th seed and world No. 20, Borna Ćorić, in the second round to reach the third round of a Masters for the first time in his career. He was defeated in the third round by Márton Fucsovics.

ATP career finals

Singles: 3 (3 runner-ups)

ATP Challenger and ITF Futures finals

Singles: 11 (6–5)

Doubles: 5 (2–3)

Performance timelines

Singles

Junior Grand Slam finals

Doubles: 1 (1 runner–up)

Record against other players

Record against top 10 players
Molčan's record against players who have been ranked in the top 10, with those who are active in boldface. Only ATP Tour main draw matches are considered:

Wins over 10 players

References

External links
 
 

1997 births
Living people
Slovak male tennis players
Sportspeople from Prešov